The 2nd Infantry Brigade was a formation of the Royal Hungarian Army that participated in the Axis invasion of Yugoslavia during World War II.

Notes

References

 

Military units and formations of Hungary in World War II